Edwin Steele was an American football and basketball coach.  Steele was the head football coach at Alma College  in Alma, Michigan.  He held that position for the 1920 season.  His coaching record at Alma was 0–7.

Head coaching record

Football

References

Year of birth missing
Year of death missing
Alma Scots football coaches
Alma Scots men's basketball coaches